Tis (also Romanized as Tīs and Ţīs; also known as Tīz and Tīz Post) is a village in Kambel-e Soleyman Rural District, in the Central District of Chabahar County, Sistan and Baluchestan Province, Iran. At the 2006 census, its population was 3,873, in 776 families.

References

External links

   Photos and information about Tis.

Populated places in Chabahar County